Laodice IV (flourished second half 3rd century BC and first half 2nd century BC) was a Greek princess, head priestess and a queen of the Seleucid Empire. Antiochus III appointed Laodice in 193 BC, as the chief priestess of the state cult dedicated to her late mother Laodice III in Media. She later was married to three kings of the Seleucid Empire  --all her brothers.

Biography

Family and early life
Laodice was of Greek Macedonian and Persian descent. She was one of the daughters and among the children born to the Seleucid Monarchs Antiochus III the Great and Laodice III. Her paternal grandparents were the former Seleucid Monarchs Seleucus II Callinicus and Laodice II, while her maternal grandparents were King Mithridates II of Pontus and his wife Laodice.

The parents of Laodice IV were first cousins, because her paternal grandfather and her maternal grandmother were brother and sister, and were among the children of Antiochus II Theos and Laodice I. She was born and raised in the Seleucid Empire. Laodice was commemorated with an honorific inscription dedicated to her at Delos.

Ancestry

First tenure as queen consort
In 196 BC, her eldest brother, crown prince Antiochus, was appointed by her father to succeed him. In that year Laodice was married to him. The marriage of Laodice IV and Antiochus was the first sibling marriage to occur in the Seleucid dynasty. From their sibling union Laodice IV bore Antiochus a daughter called Nysa.
Antiochus III appointed Laodice in 193 BC as the chief priestess of the state cult dedicated to her late mother Laodice III in Media. Later that year, her brother-husband died. The family, particularly Antiochus III, grieved his death.

Second marriage
Antiochus III arranged for her to marry again, this time to her second eldest brother Seleucus IV Philopator. In their union, they had three children: two sons, Antiochus and Demetrius I Soter, and a daughter named Laodice V. 
In 187 BC, Antiochus III died and Seleucus IV succeeded their father. He became the Seleucid King while Laodice IV became the Seleucid Queen. They reigned as the Seleucid imperial couple from 187 BC until 175 BC, when Seleucus IV died. There is no surviving record on how Laodice IV reigned as queen or how her contemporaries viewed her. Briefly in 175 BC, Laodice's first son was King. There are surviving coins dating from 175 BC that show portraits of Laodice IV and her first son with Seleucus IV, Antiochus, making them the first Seleucid King and Queen depicted on coins.

Third marriage
After the death of Seleucus IV, Laodice married for the third time her youngest brother Antiochus IV Epiphanes, who succeeded his second eldest brother as King. Antiochus IV co-ruled with his nephew Antiochus and adopted him as his son, but had him assassinated in 170 BC.
Laodice bore Antiochus IV two children: a son, Antiochus V Eupator, and a daughter, Laodice VI. When Laodice's youngest brother and first son co-ruled, her second son Demetrius I Soter was sent as a political hostage to Rome. When Antiochus IV died, the first son of Laodice IV and Antiochus IV, Antiochus V Eupator succeeded his father as Seleucid King.

See also

 List of Syrian monarchs
 Timeline of Syrian history

References

Sources

 :de:Laodike (Tochter des Antiochos III.)
 J.D. Grainger, A Seleukid prosopography and gazetteer, BRILL 1997

External links
 Coinage for Laodice IV

3rd-century BC women
2nd-century BC women
3rd-century BC Greek people
2nd-century BC Greek people
Greek people of Iranian descent
Iranian people of Greek descent
Seleucid princesses
Seleucid royal consorts
Ancient Greek priestesses
3rd-century BC clergy
2nd-century BC clergy